You, Me & the Violence is the debut studio album by French hardcore punk band Birds in Row. It was released on September 4, 2012 through Deathwish Inc. A music video for the lead track "Pilori" was released in June 2012. Musically, the album features a screamo-influenced melodic hardcore sound.

Critical reception

AbsolutePunk critic Dre Okorley wrote: "The reigning allure of the twelve tracks is that they are peppered with a sort of Tragedy/From Ashes Rise hybrid, the throat-pulling melodic hardcore that Portland trademarked so well, but are still captured in the Birds In Row mystique." Okorley also concluded that the album "is in a league of its own, with hardly anything in its associated genres to be bullied by and rivaled." Exclaim!s Bradley Zorgdrager stated: "The record ends on a high note, as "Lovers Have Their Say" swells, but never fully climaxes, giving listeners a chance to reflect on the masterpiece they just took in as the feedback takes over."

Track listing 
All songs composed by Birds in Row.
 "Pilori" – 2:27
 "There Is Only One Chair in This Room" – 2:16	
 "Cages" – 1:02	
 "Guillotine" – 1:43
 "Walter Freeman" – 3:23
 "Last Last Chance" – 2:34
 "You, Me & the Violence" – 2:59
 "Grey Hair" – 1:23
 "Cold War Everyday" – 1:08
 "The Illusionist" – 1:50
 "Police & Thieves" – 2:03
 "Lovers Have Their Say" – 12:52

Personnel 
You, Me & the Violence personnel adapted from CD liner notes.
 A. Sauve – recording, production
 S. Biguet – recording, production, mixing
 A. Douches – mastering

References

External links
 

Deathwish Inc. albums
2012 debut albums
Birds in Row albums